Jaswantraj Mehta was an Indian politician.  He was elected to the Lok Sabha, the lower house of the Parliament of India from Pali, Rajasthan as a member of the Indian National Congress.

References

External links
 Official biographical sketch in Parliament of India website

1898 births
Year of death missing
India MPs 1952–1957

India MPs 1957–1962
India MPs 1962–1967
Lok Sabha members from Rajasthan
Indian National Congress politicians